Connes' embedding problem, formulated by Alain Connes in the 1970s, is a major problem in von Neumann algebra theory. During that time, the problem was reformulated in several different areas of mathematics. Dan Voiculescu developing his free entropy theory found that Connes’ embedding problem is related to the existence of microstates. Some results of von Neumann algebra theory can be obtained assuming positive solution to the problem. The problem is connected to some basic questions in quantum theory, which led to the realization that it also has important implications in computer science.

The problem admits a number of equivalent formulations. Notably, it is equivalent to the following long standing problems:

 Kirchberg's QWEP conjecture in C*-algebra theory
 Tsirelson's problem in quantum information theory
 The predual of any (separable) von Neumann algebra is finitely representable in the trace class.

In January 2020, Ji, Natarajan, Vidick, Wright, and Yuen announced a result in quantum complexity theory that implies a negative answer to Connes' embedding problem. However, an error was discovered in September 2020 in a result used to derive the formula; a new proof was published as a preprint in September, and a proof published in Communications of the ACM in November 2021 is currently unreviewed.

Statement
Let  be a free ultrafilter on the natural numbers and let R be the hyperfinite type II1 factor with trace . One can construct the ultrapower  as follows: let  be the von Neumann algebra of norm-bounded sequences and let .

A positive solution to the problem would imply that invariant subspaces exist for a large class of operators in type II1 factors (Uffe Haagerup); all countable discrete groups are hyperlinear.  A positive solution to the problem would be implied by equality between free entropy  and free entropy defined by microstates (Dan Voiculescu). In January 2020, a group of researchers claimed to have resolved the problem in the negative, i.e., there exist type II1 von Neumann factors that do not embed in an ultrapower  of the hyperfinite II1 factor.

The problem admits a number of equivalent formulations.

Conferences dedicated to Connes' embedding problem
Connes' embedding problem and quantum information theory workshop; Vanderbilt University in Nashville Tennessee; May 1–7, 2020 (postponed; TBA)
 The many faceted Connes' Embedding Problem; BIRS, Canada; July 14–19, 2019 
 Winter school: Connes' embedding problem and quantum information theory; University of Oslo, January 7–11, 2019 
 Workshop on Sofic and Hyperlinear Groups and the Connes Embedding Conjecture; UFSC Florianopolis, Brazil; June 10–21, 2018
 Approximation Properties in Operator Algebras and Ergodic Theory; UCLA;  April 30 - May 5, 2018 
 Operator Algebras and Quantum Information Theory;  Institut Henri Poincare, Paris; December 2017
 Workshop on Operator Spaces, Harmonic Analysis and Quantum Probability; ICMAT, Madrid; May 20-June 14, 2013
 Fields Workshop around Connes Embedding Problem – University of Ottawa, May 16–18, 2008

References

Further reading
 
 
 
 
 
 

Von Neumann algebras
Disproved conjectures